Amanda Jones is an American composer and musician who has composed scores for films, commercials, and television series. She is a member of the indie rock band The Anti-Job and has earned the distinction of becoming the first African American woman nominated in a score category at the Emmys for her work on the Apple TV+ series Home.

Life 

Jones was born on October 26, 1988 in Columbia, Maryland and began playing piano at the age of three and guitar around the age of fourteen. Jones attended Vassar College intending to study chemistry but subsequently changed her major to music. Jones studied music composition, production, and classical guitar under Terry Champlin. She earned a BA in music from Vassar and received certificates in film scoring and orchestration from the Berklee College of Music.

After graduating from Vassar, Jones moved to Los Angeles in 2010 to record with her indie rock band, The Anti-Job, and started to consider a parallel career composing music for television and films.

Career 
In 2014 through 2016, Jones worked as a music production assistant for Hans Zimmer, Henry Jackson, John Powell, and Michael Levine. Her work during that time included the films How to Train Your Dragon 2 and Kingsman: The Secret Service.

In 2016, Jones landed a job as a senior music coordinator for Lionsgate.  During that time she worked on several television series including Nashville (CMT), Dear White People (Netflix), and Greenleaf (OWN).  In 2018, Jones got an opportunity to score her first feature film, One Angry Black Man.  Jones has since scored numerous short and feature films, including Andre Hormann’s documentary feature Ringside; Smriti Mundhra and Sami Khan’s Oscar-nominated documentary St. Louis Superman; and Sujata Day’s feature film Definition Please.

Jones television credits include OWN’s anthology series Cherish the Day, produced by Ava DuVernay; BET’s Twenties produced by Lena Waithe; HBO’s A Black Lady Sketch Show produced by Robin Thede and Issa Rae; the comedy series Shitty Boyfriends produced by Lisa Kudrow; Love in the Time of Corona on Freeform; and the Apple TV+ series Home.

Jones scored the “Maine” episode of Home, for which she received an Emmy nomination for Outstanding Music Composition for a Documentary Series or Special (Original Dramatic Score), becoming the first African American woman nominated in a scores category at the Emmys.

Discography

Films

Television

Awards and nominations 
 Outstanding Music Composition for a Documentary Series or Special (Original Dramatic Score) -Home – "Maine" – Apple TV+ – MediaWeaver/Four M Studios/Altimeter Films, Composer.
 NAACP Image Award for Outstanding Gospel/Christian Album for Greenleaf on OWN.
 S&G Rising Award for musical composition work in film and television (2019).

Initiatives 
Co-founder of Composers Diversity Collective whose mission is to increase the visibility of composers of diverse backgrounds and facilitates mentoring.

References 

1988 births
Living people
American composers
Vassar College alumni
African-American film score composers